Michael Mountain is a summit in West Virginia, in the United States.

The peak was named after Michael Daughtery, a pioneer who was killed in a bear attack.

References

Mountains of Pocahontas County, West Virginia
Mountains of West Virginia